PXC may mean:

Perplex City, an Alternate Reality Game by Mind Candy
A line of noise-cancelling headphones by Sennheiser
Photonic Cross Connect, a type of optical cross-connect device that switches optical signals in a fiber optic network
Plataforma per Catalunya, PxC, a Spanish political party.